Almirante Oquendo, was an  armored cruiser of the Spanish Navy that fought at the Battle of Santiago de Cuba during the Spanish–American War.

Technical characteristics
Almirante Oquendo was built at Bilbao, Spain. The ship's keel was laid down in January 1889. The vessel was launched in 1891, and completed in 1893. She had two funnels and was fast and well armed. Her main armament was mounted on the center line in single barbettes fore and aft. Her armor was poor: her  guns had only lightly armored hoods, her  guns were mounted in the open on the upper deck, her armor belt was thin and protected only two-thirds of her length, and she had a high, unprotected freeboard that took much damage during the Battle of Santiago de Cuba. Like other nineteenth-century warships, she was heavily furnished and decorated with wood, which the Spanish failed to remove prior to combat and which would feed fires during the battle. She was named for the victorious commander of the 1633 battle of Perambuko.

Operational history

Almirante Oquendo was in Havana, Cuba, in the spring of 1898 as tensions rose between the United States and Spain. After the battleship  exploded and sank at Havana on 15 February 1898, Almirante Oquendo rendezvoused there with her sister ship, the armored cruiser . Ordered back across the Atlantic as war approached, both ships were assigned to the Spanish Navy's 1st Squadron, which was concentrating at São Vicente in Portugal's Cape Verde Islands under Vice Admiral Pascual Cervera y Topete. They arrived at São Vicente on 19 April 1898.

The Spanish–American War began while Almirante Oquendo was at São Vicente. Ordered by neutral Portugal in accordance with international law to leave São Vicente within 24 hours of the declaration of war, Almirante Oquendo and the rest of Cervera's squadron departed on 29 April 1898, bound for San Juan, Puerto Rico. Cervera's ships reached French-owned Martinique in the Lesser Antilles on 10 May 1898. While Almirante Oquendo and the other large ships loitered in international waters, two Spanish destroyers went into Fort-de-France to ask for coal. France was neutral and would not supply coal, so the Spanish squadron departed on 12 May 1898 for Dutch-owned Curaçao, where Cervera expected to meet a collier. Cervera arrived at Willemstad on 14 May, but the Netherlands also was neutral, and strictly enforced its neutrality by allowing only Vizcaya and the armored cruiser  to enter port and permitting them to load only 600 tons of coal. On 15 May, Cervera's ships departed, no longer bound for San Juan, which by now was under a U.S. Navy blockade, but for as-yet unblockaded Santiago de Cuba on the southeastern coast of Cuba, arriving there on 19 May 1898. Cervera hoped to refit his ships there before he could be trapped. His squadron was still in the harbor of Santiago de Cuba when an American squadron arrived on 27 May 1898 and began a blockade which would drag on for 37 days.

Almirante Oquendo and the other ships endured occasional American naval bombardments of the harbor. Almirante Oquendo still had one 140 mm gun out of commission, 80 percent of the 140 mm ammunition was defective, and nothing could be done under the circumstances about her fouled bottom. Some of her men joined others from the fleet in a Naval Brigade to fight against a U.S. Army overland drive toward Santiago de Cuba.

By the beginning of July 1898, that drive threatened to capture Santiago de Cuba, and Cervera decided that his squadron's only hope was to try to escape into the open sea by running the blockade. The decision was made on 1 July 1898, with the break-out set for 3 July 1898. The crew of Almirante Oquendo spent 2 July 1898 returning from Naval Brigade service and preparing for action. Almirante Oquendo was to be the fourth ship in line during the escape, following Cervera's flagship Infanta Maria Teresa, Vizcaya, and the armored cruiser , with the destroyers  and  bringing up the rear. While Infanta Maria Teresa sacrificed herself by attacking the fastest American ship, the armored cruiser , Almirante Oquendo and the others were to put on all the speed they could and run westward for the open sea.

At about 0845 hours on 3 July 1898, the Spanish ships got underway. The U.S. squadron sighted the Spanish ships in the channel at about 0935, and the Battle of Santiago de Cuba began.

While Infanta Maria Teresa and Vizacaya charged Brooklyn and the two destroyers turned westward farther inshore, Almirante Oquendo followed Cristobal Colon in a dash to the west. When Brooklyn turned away to the east, Vizcaya and Infanta Maria Teresa also turned west, brushing past the last obstacle in the path of the four Spanish armored cruisers, the armed yacht .

Almirante Oquendo now found herself back in the line-ahead formation the squadron had formed when it left its anchorage, in fourth place behind the other three armored cruisers, although now without the following destroyers, which were being chased farther inshore. The U.S. squadron gave chase as the Spanish ships made an all-out break for the west, with the American ships about a mile to port of and slightly astern of the Spanish ships. At 1035, the sinking Infanta Maria Teresa was driven ashore with heavy damage and fires.

As last ship in the Spanish line during a stern chase, Almirante Oquendo naturally drew more than her share of attention from her pursuers. Concentrated fire from the three battleships punished Almirante Oquendo. Iowa scored 43 six-pounder hits which killed or wounded most of the sailors on the Spanish cruiser's upper decks, where her 5.5-inch guns were mounted without protection, and one of her own 5.5-inch shells exploded prematurely in the gun's breach, killing the gun's crew. Almirante Oquendo drew admiration from her opponents by lashing back with a high volume of shell- and machine-gun fire. But she took three 8-inch (203 mm), one 6-inch (152 mm), one 5-inch (127 mm), and nine 4-inch (102 mm) hits, and soon a fire started in her after torpedo room that could not be brought under control and threatened to spark an ammunition explosion that would have wrecked the ship.

Some of her sailors made it ashore, although they had to beware of Cuban insurgents, who began to shoot the survivors of the wrecked Spanish ships. Others were rescued by American sailors who brought small boats alongside the wrecks to take off survivors.  Almirante Oquendo lost 80 dead in the engagement.

Postwar, a U.S. Navy survey team evaluating Spanish wrecks for their potential for being raised and put in American service concluded that Almirante Oquendo was beyond salvage.

Commemoration
Three Hontoria 140-mm (5.5-inch) guns from Almirante Oquendo are on display in the United States. One – with damage to its shield incurred during the ship′s final battle – is located outside the U.S. Navy Personnel Support Detachment office (Building 92) at Joint Base Anacostia–Bolling in Washington, D.C. A plaque mounted near the gun reads:

This Hontoria 140mm (5.5 in) naval gun was taken from the Spanish cruiser ALMIRANTE OQUENDO following her capture at the Battle of Santiago de Cuba on 3 July 1898 during the Spanish American War. ALMIRANTE OQUENDO, of the INFANTA MARIA TERESA class, was one of six Spanish ships which sortied from the Cuban port in order to avoid capture in the harbor. None escaped the blockading U.S. Naval Squadron. The hole in the gun′s shield was inflicted by one of approximately 50 rounds which hit ALMIRANTE OQUENDO.

The gun was restored by sailors of Processing Division and General Detail, Naval District Washington, during 1982 and 1983.

Another gun is on display at the Jefferson Barracks Military Post in Missouri. The third gun, mounted in 1903 to commemorate Rear Admiral William T. Sampson – who was in overall operational command of the U.S. naval forces that fought in the Battle of Santiago de Cuba – is on display in a park in Palmyra, New York.

At present, the Naval Battle Underwater Park of Santiago de Cuba has been created to preserve the wrecks of the ships and pay tribute to the brave sailors who perished in the place.  Aquatic immersions can be made.

Notes

References
 Chesneau, Roger, and Eugene M. Kolesnik, Eds. Conway's All The World's Fighting Ships 1860–1905. New York, New York: Mayflower Books Inc., 1979. .
 Nofi, Albert A. The Spanish–American War, 1898. Conshohocken, Pennsylvania: Combined Books, Inc., 1996. .

External links

 The Spanish–American War Centennial Website: Almirante Oquendo
 Department of the Navy: Naval Historical Center: Online Library of Selected Images: Spanish Navy Ships: Almirante Oquendo (Armored Cruiser, 1891–1898)

1891 ships
Infanta Maria Teresa-class armored cruisers
Ships built in Spain
Spanish–American War cruisers of Spain
Maritime incidents in 1898
Shipwrecks in the Caribbean Sea
Shipwrecks of the Spanish–American War